The 5th Macau International Movie Festival ceremony, organized by the Macau Film and Television Media Association and China International Cultural Communication Center, honored the best films of 2013 in the Greater China Region and took place on December 23, 2013, at the Wynn Macau in Macau.

CZ12 and Ip Man: The Final Fight won two awards each, with the latter film winning Best Actor.

Winners and nominees

Extra Awards
Outstanding Female Lead Award (优秀女主角奖)
Best Action Choreography (最佳动作设计奖)
Best Original Film Soundtrack (最佳原唱电影歌曲奖) 
Chinese Film Contribution Award (中国电影贡献奖)
Outstanding Producer Award (优秀制片人奖)

References

External links

Golden Lotus Awards
Macau
2013 in Macau
2013 in Chinese cinema